Rottenbach or Röttenbach may refer to:

Rottenbach, Thuringia, a village and former municipality in Thuringia, Germany
Rottenbach, Bavaria, a village in the municipality Lautertal, Bavaria, Germany
Rottenbach, Austria, a municipality in Upper Austria
Rottenbach (Ilm), a river in Thuringia, Germany, tributary of the Ilm
Rottenbach (Rinne), a river in Thuringia, Germany, tributary of the Rinne
Röttenbach, a municipality in the district of Erlangen-Höchstadt, Bavaria, Germany
Röttenbach, Roth, a municipality in the district of Roth, Bavaria, Germany